Dan Ashton (born 1954 or 1955) is a Canadian politician, who was elected to the Legislative Assembly of British Columbia in the 2013 provincial election, and has been re-elected in 2017 and 2020. He represents the electoral district of Penticton as a member of the British Columbia Liberal Party.

Prior to his election to the legislature, Ashton served as mayor of Penticton from 2008 until 2013 and prior to that as city councillor from 1999 until 2008.

Electoral record

References

British Columbia Liberal Party MLAs
Mayors of Penticton
Living people
21st-century Canadian politicians
Year of birth uncertain
Year of birth missing (living people)